, born Tadao Masamune, was a noted Japanese critic and writer of fiction, and a leading member of the Japanese Naturalist school of literature.

Biography
Masamune was born in Bizen, Okayama Prefecture, as the eldest (and sickly) son of an old and influential family of landowners. In 1896 he joined the English department of the Tokyo Senmon Gakko (now Waseda University), and was baptized as a Christian by priest Uemura Masahisa the following year. After graduation, he worked in the university's Publishing Department, and began writing literary, art, and cultural criticism for the Yomiuri Shinbun newspaper in 1903. 

In 1904 Masamune published his first novel, Sekibaku (Solitude), in the literary magazine Shinshosetsu. Already known for his distinctive criticism, he gained attention as a writer of fiction with Doko-e ("Whither?"), which was serialised in Waseda bungaku in 1908 and is regarded his representative work as a naturalistic writer. In 1910, he left the Yomiuri Shinbun to become an independent writer. His 1911 novel The Clay Doll (Doro ningyō) gained further acclaim. Masamune's early writings in particular have repeatedly been described as nihilistic and bearing a negative view on life and its delusions, and his criticisms called cynical. Martin Seymour-Smith stated that his earlier novels "are somewhat over-ebulliently nihilistic […] but his sense of loneliness – the real subject, it has rightly been said, of the modern Japanese novel – was always authentic".

Masamune wrote in a variety of genres; major works include the stories Ushibeya no nioi ("The Stench of the Stable") and Shisha seisha ("The Dead and the Living"), both 1916, the play Jinsei no kōfuku ("The Happiness of Human Life"), 1924, and the 1932 criticism collection Bundan jimbutsu hyōron ("Critical Essays on Literary Figures"), which was expanded into Sakka ron ("A Study of Writers") in 1941–42.

Masamune received the Order of Culture in 1950, and the Yomiuri Prize for Literature in 1960 for Kotoshi no aki. His birthplace has been turned into a museum. Of Masamune's younger brothers, Atsuo is known as a poet and scholar, Genkei as a botanist, and Tokusaburo as a painter.

Selected works

 1904: Sekibaku
 1908: Doko-e
 1911: The Clay Doll
 1916: Ushibeya no nioi
 1916: Shisha seisha
 1924: Jinsei no kōfuku
 1925: The Couple Next Door
 1932: Bundan jimbutsu hyōron
 1938: Shisō mushisō
 1938: Bundanteki jijoden
 1941–42: Sakka ron
 1947: Tenshi hokaku
 1948: Shizenshugi seisuishi
 1949: Uchimura Kanzō
 1949: Nippon dasshutsu
 1959: Kotoshi no aki

Translations

References

External links

 
 
 
 Jlit entry

Japanese writers
1962 deaths
1879 births
Recipients of the Order of Culture
Yomiuri Prize winners
Pseudonymous writers